Antsaravibe is a municipality in Madagascar. It belongs to the district of Ambilobe, which is a part of Diana Region. According to 2001 census the population of Antsaravibe was 10648.

Primary and junior level secondary education are available in town. The majority of the population (50%) works in fishing, while 49% are farmers.  The most important crops are sugarcane and cotton; also tobacco is an important agricultural product. Services provide employment for 1% of the population.

References and notes 

Populated places in Diana Region